The Appin Dogs Rugby League Football Club is an Australian rugby league football club based in Appin, New South Wales. They currently play in the Group 6 Rugby League competition.

Playing Record

Notable players 
Michael De Vere (1997-09 Brisbane Broncos & Huddersfield Giants)
Bryce Gibbs (2003-14 Wests Tigers & Cronulla Sharks) 
Stuart Flanagan (2006-11 Wests Tigers, Canberra Raiders & Cronulla Sharks)

See also

List of rugby league clubs in Australia

References 

http://www.wollondillyadvertiser.com.au/story/3778839/dogs-ready-to-build-legacy/

http://www.camdenadvertiser.com.au/story/2514415/gallery-group-6-finals-bring-out-the-best/

External links

Rugby league teams in Sydney
Rugby clubs established in 1953
1953 establishments in Australia